Antonio Ferrara (born April 4, 1912) was an Argentine professional football player. He also held Italian citizenship.

His older brother Nicola Ferrara also played football professionally (including 3 seasons in the Serie A on the same teams as Antonio). To distinguish them, Nicola was known as Ferrara I and Antonio as Ferrara II.

Honours
 Serie A champion: 1937/38.

1912 births
Year of death missing
Argentine footballers
Serie A players
U.S. Livorno 1915 players
S.S.C. Napoli players
Inter Milan players
Estudiantes de La Plata footballers
Association football midfielders